Santo Tomás is a municipality and town in the Colombian department of Atlántico.

References

External links
 Gobernacion del Atlantico - Santo Tomás
 Santo Tomás official website

Municipalities of Atlántico Department